Pictilini is a tribe of cicadas in the family Cicadidae, found in Australia. There are at least two genera and two described species in Pictilini.

Genera
These two genera belong to the tribe Pictilini:
 Chrysocicada Boulard, 1989 c g
 Pictila Moulds, 2012 c g
Data sources: i = ITIS, c = Catalogue of Life, g = GBIF, b = Bugguide.net

References

Further reading

 
 
 
 
 
 
 
 
 
 

Cicadettinae
Hemiptera tribes